Siemens (Pakistan) Engineering Company Limited is an engineering conglomerate and financial services contractor headquartered in Karachi, Pakistan. It has multiple regional offices all over the country.

History
Active since 1953, Siemens Pakistan is one of the largest providers of engineering services and management in the country, with overseeing ongoing projects in healthcare, defence development, energy, telecommunications, computer expansion and heavy construction management. 

When founded, Siemens Pakistan was originally focused on providing the network of communications, but its role in the energy sector has grown since 1987. In 2011–12, Siemens Engineering generated its profit margin to ~€138.3 million in its investments in the energy sector. Its original corporate programme is to provide engineering and technological solutions in energy, healthcare, infrastructure and construction industry.

In April 2015, Siemens sold its distribution transformer manufacturing business along with assets of land and building in Sindh Industrial and Trading Estate for $32 million.

In August 2015, Siemens Pakistan decided to transfer its healthcare business sector to a private limited company headquartered in Lahore, Pakistan.

In December 2015, healthcare business ownership was transferred to the German company Siemens Healthcare.

Services
 Power and gas
 Wind and renewable power
 Power generation services
 Energy management
 Mobility
 Digital factory
 Process industries and drive
 Healthcare

References

Pakistan
Pakistani subsidiaries of foreign companies
Electronics companies of Pakistan
Companies based in Karachi
Companies listed on the Pakistan Stock Exchange